Táchira is one of the 23 states of Venezuela.

Táchira may refer to:

 Táchira River, a river on the border between Colombia and Venezuela
 Deportivo Táchira Fútbol Club, a Venezuelan football club
 Vuelta al Táchira, a Venezuelan bicycle race

See also